A mix-in is a type of dessert made of ice cream and another flavoring such as candy. Mix-in desserts are traditionally sold in an ice cream parlor and are made at the time of ordering. Popular examples of this dessert include Dairy Queen's Blizzard and McDonald's McFlurry.

Product description
A mix-in is a type of dessert made with ice cream and another product that is either blended or folded in.

History
The concept of mixing in additional flavors at the time of ordering was created by Steve Herrell in 1973. Mr. Herrell founded Steve's Ice Cream, near Boston, where they would crush Heath Bars and other candies or confections and mix them into ice cream. Another term for the concept is "smoosh-ins". His system spread across the industry from his store, and became the model for many other ice cream businesses and desserts.

References

See also
 Amy's Ice Creams Texas based company founded by former Steve's employee
 Cold Stone Creamery
 Dairy Queen

Ice cream